Luis José Monge (August 21, 1918 – June 2, 1967) was a convicted mass murderer who was executed in the gas chamber at Colorado State Penitentiary in 1967.  Monge was the last inmate to be executed before an unofficial moratorium on execution that lasted for more than four years while most death penalty cases were on appeal, culminating in the U.S. Supreme Court decision in Furman v. Georgia in 1972, invalidating all existing death penalty statutes as written.

Murders
Monge, a Denver, Colorado, insurance salesman, was a native of Puerto Rico who grew up in New York. He was convicted and sentenced to death for murdering his wife, Leonarda, and three of their ten children after she discovered his incestuous relationship with their 13-year-old daughter, Diann Kissell. The murders were committed on June 29, 1963.

Monge's murder victims were: Leonarda, Alan (aged 6), Vincent (aged 4), and Teresa (11 months old). Immediately after the four murders, Monge called police and admitted his guilt. 

The alleged motive for the murders was "to prevent exposure of sex crimes committed by defendant with his own children". He beat his wife to death with a steel bar, stabbed Teresa, choked Vincent, and bludgeoned Alan with the steel bar.

He had no prior felony convictions; in 1961, however, he abandoned his family for two months and served a short jail sentence in Louisiana for vagrancy.

Execution

After Monge had pleaded not guilty by reason of insanity, psychiatrists evaluated him and found him to be sane.  He then insisted on pleading guilty to first-degree murder.  A jury that was convened for the penalty phase of the trial recommended a death sentence, and Monge's conviction and sentence were affirmed on appeal. In January 1966, Governor John Arthur Love suspended all executions in Colorado, pending a referendum on capital punishment by voters. On November 8, 1966, the voters decided to retain the death penalty by a three-to-one margin. In March 1967, Monge attracted national attention when he asked a Denver court to allow him to be hanged at high noon on the front steps of the Denver City and County Building. This request was denied.

The following month, Monge fired his attorneys and directed that no attempts should be made to save his life. He gave up all of his appeals and asked to be executed. Nonetheless, his surviving children appealed for clemency. Doctors again evaluated Monge's mental status and found him mentally competent for execution. A week before his death, Monge shared a final meal with his surviving seven children. On the eve of the execution, some seventy members of the Colorado Council to Abolish Capital Punishment gathered on the steps of the state capitol building in Denver in a rally to protest the execution. On June 2, 1967, Monge was executed at the age of 48 in the state's gas chamber. Upon his death, and according to his wishes, one of Monge's corneas was transplanted to a teenaged reformatory inmate. 

Monge was buried in Greenwood Pioneer Cemetery in Cañon City, Colorado in the pauper's section set aside for deceased inmates of the state penitentiary. His grave lies a few feet from that of John Bizup, Jr., a convicted murderer executed in 1964.  The metal marker indicating Monge's grave has been marred with bullet holes. The Colorado gas chamber, retired after Monge's execution, is now an exhibit at the Museum of Colorado Prisons in Cañon City.

Moratorium 
Opponents of capital punishment, in an attempt to abolish the death penalty, waged a national litigation campaign that ultimately found its way to the Supreme Court of the United States.  The Court agreed to review a series of cases challenging that the death penalty was unconstitutional.  While the Supreme Court reviewed these cases, lower courts in all states stayed all pending executions, thereby creating a de facto moratorium on death sentences throughout the nation.  The period of this "unofficial" moratorium on capital punishment began on June 2, 1967, with the execution of Luis Monge in Colorado.  It would end nearly ten years later on January 17, 1977, with the execution of Gary Gilmore in Utah.

Execution in context 
Luis Jose Monge's was the last execution both in Colorado and in the United States prior to the 1972 Supreme Court decision in Furman v. Georgia. It would be almost ten years before any state would carry out another execution, the state of Utah executed Gary Gilmore on January 17, 1977. The state of Colorado itself took 30 years before it would do so in the execution of Gary Lee Davis, on October 13, 1997. Monge's was one of only two executions to occur in the United States in 1967. His was also the last execution by gas chamber in Colorado.

See also 
 Capital punishment in Colorado
 Capital punishment in the United States
 Furman v. Georgia
 Gas chamber
 Gregg v. Georgia

References

External links 
 Colorado Executions: 1859–1967
 Colorado State Archives: State Penitentiary Records – A Short History of the Colorado State Penitentiary
 The Death Penalty: Office of the Clark County Prosecuting Attorney – Capital Punishment Timeline
 The Executioner's Song: Job's not all it's cracked up to be
 Executions: Regional Studies of Central States
 Eye for an Eye: The grisly legacy of Colorado's death penalty past

1918 births
1967 deaths
20th-century executions of American people
20th-century executions by Colorado
American mass murderers
Executed mass murderers
Executed Puerto Rican people
People convicted of murder by Colorado
People executed by Colorado by gas chamber
Puerto Rican people convicted of murder
American murderers of children
Familicides